Hockey at the 1928 Olympics may refer to:

Ice hockey at the 1928 Winter Olympics
Field hockey at the 1928 Summer Olympics